Lee Arthur Carter (born October 7, 1971), known professionally by his stage name Viper, is an American rapper, record producer and actor. Carter has been producing music since childhood, but he received widespread attention online for his 2008 album, You'll Cowards Don't Even Smoke Crack. The prolific nature of his work, together with his commitment to self production, has garnered him a cult following as an outsider artist, with comparisons drawn to rapper Lil B and musician Wesley Willis.  He is also regarded as one of the originators of cloud rap.

Biography

Early life 

Carter was born in El Dorado, Arkansas. He began playing the piano at the age of five. At the age of six, he relocated to the Hiram Clarke neighborhood of Houston, Texas and started rapping at the age of nine. In 1997, he was an actor in the film Fifth Ward, directed by his brother, Greg Carter.

Music career 

While Carter reportedly started rapping as a child, his first musical appearance was on the soundtrack for Fifth Ward, under the name "."

Originally under the artist name Lee Dogg, Carter released his first album, Lee Dogg, on October 7, 2003, which would later be renamed Hustlin' Thick. The album was created mostly in collaboration with various artists signed to local music label Dope House Records at the time, whom he thanks multiple times in the liner notes. Carter planned to continue releasing albums under the Lee Dogg name and had numerous plans for collaborations, but for unknown reasons this never happened, and he retroactively changed both the name of his album to Hustlin' Thick and his artist name to Viper.

Carter continued to release mixtapes regularly throughout the early 2000s under his Rhyme Time Records label through the CD Baby website, becoming one of the first cloud rap artists. Throughout this period he showed frustration at his obscurity and limited exposure, as detailed on one of his early songs, "9900 Haters On The Wall", where he claimed out of ten thousand people who heard his albums on the site, only a hundred had bought them.

His obscurity would continue until early 2013, when the title track of his album You'll Cowards Don't Even Smoke Crack, released in 2008, was posted onto YouTube. Since then it has garnered over three million views, and news outlets started reporting on him shortly after. You'll Cowards Don't Even Smoke Crack is by far Carter's most popular album. University of Notre Dame newspaper The Observer noted that the album became an "internet meme due to its shockingly upfront title and unique album cover".

Despite the heavily independent and lo-fi nature of the album, it received positive coverage in the music press. Sputnik Music wrote that the album fuses "a nostalgic and ethereal blend of cloud rap and vaporwave". The Chicago Reader wrote that the album is "outsider-artist genius. People on the Internet are initially drawn to Carter because of his blatant disregard for grammar, outrageously violent and drug-centric lyrics, and how sonically bizarre he is in general."

Since then, Carter has remained active, releasing almost an album per day on average in 2014, often consisting of recycled or chopped and screwed material, while making his music available on Spotify and iTunes and giving interviews to the local music press. As of 2020, he has released more than 1,500 albums, although only approximately 15 or so consist of solely original material. In early 2019, he created a new YouTube channel, RapperViper VEVO, as a collaborative project with his new video editor.

Personal life 
Carter has four children; one born in 2002, two with his ex-wife, and the most recent being born in October 2020. He claims to believe he is the second Christ, and refers to himself as "Black Jesus" and is a devout Christian. In 2021, Betty Carter, Lee Carter's mother, died at the age of 79.

Carter regularly wears tight women's shapewear, which he refers to as "the hornace (harness) of death" or "THOD". He wears multiple THODs at a time, and claims that the pain felt from wearing the shapewear strengthens his "resolve to be number #1". Carter also alleges that wearing shapewear made him contract pneumonia in 2016, which he says nearly killed him.

Style 
His low-budget, DIY aesthetic is present not only in his music but also its accompanying videos and album art, which frequently consist of simple self-portraits, clip art and his name and the album title superimposed in plain text.

Musically, he is recognized for his deep voice, occasional use of autotune, and slowed-down, low-fidelity and glitchy and ethereal production predating cloud rap or the chopped and screwed subgenre native to Carter's Houston scene.

Partial discography 
Carter has released hundreds of albums. However, a vast majority of these releases contain songs that have been chopped and screwed, slowed down, or simply recycled and put under different names with no change to their content. Therefore, only releases which contain original material have been listed here.

Studio albums/mixtapes
 Hustlin' Thick (2003, originally under the name Lee Dogg)
 Ready and...Willing (2006)
 Heartless Hoodlum (2006)
 The Southwest Hooligan (2006)
 You'll Cowards Don't Even Smoke Crack (2008)
 The Paper Man (2008)
 The Hiram Clarke Hustler (2009)
 These Rappers Claim They Hard When Them Fags Never Even Seen the Pen (2010)
 5-9 Piru Music: The Gang, the Album, the Label (2013)
 Kill Urself My Man and I Have The Best Piece and Chain Ever Made! (partially) (2013)
 Rich and NOT Famous (2013)
 Tha Top Malla (2015)
 Death from in Front (2016)
 Shed Skin: Tha Hidden Treasures, Vol. 1 (1997-2017)  (2022)
 Thug's Renditions: Tha Hidden Treasures, Vol. 2 (2017-2018)  (2022)
 Pussy Boy Ill Kill Ya (All I Need Is Tha Money): Tha Hidden Treasures, Vol. 3 (2018-2022)  (2022)
 Ya'll Cowards Don't Even Smoke Crack (You'll Cowards Don't Even Smoke Crack II) (2023)

Collaborative albums/EPs
 Death 2 Snitches (EP) (with Nmesh) (2015)
 World Rap Star (with Nolan) (2017)
 Bout tha Money (with Broken Machine Films) (2018)
 They Hate Me Cuz I'm Vaporwave (with Nmesh and KOJA) (2018)
 Leftovers: Tha Hidden Treasures, Vol. 4 (EP) (2022)
 Violent Behaviors Associated With Crack Cocaine Use (Split) (with corruptedhdd) (2022)

Filmography

See also 

Southern hip hop
Chopped and screwed

References

External links 

African-American male rappers
African-American record producers
American hip hop record producers
Bloods
People from El Dorado, Arkansas
Gangsta rappers
Outsider artists
Outsider musicians
Rappers from Houston
Southern hip hop musicians
Self-declared messiahs
Underground rappers
University of Houston alumni
Record producers from Texas
1971 births
Living people
21st-century African-American people
20th-century African-American people